The Worboys Committee was formed by the British government to review signage on all British roads. In its July 1963 report Traffic signs: report of the committee on traffic signs for all-purpose roads, it found existing road signs to be  obsolete for the increasing numbers of motor vehicles and their increasing speeds, and made over a dozen key recommendations. The committee went on to completely revise road signs in Britain, with an emphasis on symbols alone, adopting standard colour and shape practices used in mainland Europe and a new typeface. Its principles were adopted and are still the basis of all road signs in the United Kingdom.

The Anderson Committee
The first moves to a new signage system were prompted by the first motorways. Flaws of existing signs had already been observed with drivers at speed struggling to interpret them. New signs were needed in 1958 for the opening of the Preston By-pass, the first motorway. A separate committee, known as the 'Anderson Committee', was assembled in 1957 to design signage. The committee took inspiration from the United States and Germany who were designing their own motorways and signage to go with them. Two graphic designers were commissioned to design the system of signage: Jock Kinneir and his assistant (and later business partner) Margaret Calvert.

The Worboys Committee and advisors
Two articles were published in 1961 by graphic designer Herbert Spencer, illustrating the shortcomings of non-motorway British road signs. The committee was created, chaired by Sir Walter Worboys of ICI. T. G. Usborne of the Ministry of Transport had charge of proceedings, and Kinneir and Calvert were again commissioned as designers.

In 1963 the committee released Traffic signs: report of the committee on traffic signs for all-purpose roads. This completely revised road signs in Britain with an emphasis on symbols alone. It adopted standard colour and shape practices used in mainland Europe and used a new typeface that had already been used on the motorway signs, called Transport. On 1 January 1965, the Traffic Signs Regulations and General Directions (TSRGD), the legal framework for road signs in Britain, was revised to adopt the proposed changes in the report.

Pre-Worboys sign flaws
The report found eight primary flaws in the United Kingdom's traffic signage.

Most pre-Worboys signs consisted of two signs: the top one was one of four designs, a red 'triangle', 'disk', 'ring' or 'triangle in ring' that identified the sign's type; the second lower sign identified the hazard or restriction. The majority also lacked any larger dimensions for use on higher-speed roads.

"Traffic signs – 1963"

The report found existing road signs to be completely obsolete in view of increasing numbers of motor vehicles and their increasing speeds, and made over a dozen key recommendations:
Wording should be Sentence case, not in all capital letters.
 Signs should reflect the design of traffic signs used in the rest of Europe, with an emphasis on using symbols and the shape of sign to convey the message, not words. Further, doing away with the previous standard sign designs consisting of two separate signs to form a complete sign.
 Provision of give way and stop signs at junctions on minor roads when they meet primary routes.
 More usage of sign illumination, and improvements to existing standards and increased use of cat's eyes (roadway reflectors).
 Uniformity in the deployment and use of traffic signs.
 Clearer marking of primary routes, through use of colour-coded signs to aid drivers in identifying them if they are unfamiliar with an area.
 Direction signs should be colour-coded, with primary routes having green signs with white words and yellow route numbers; signs on-priority roads should be black and white.
The report suggested approximately 136 signs. The designs proposed in the report received further revisions before the 1964 TSRGD, as the proposed prohibited signs featured a 'slash' on signs like 'Bicycles prohibited', 'All motor vehicles prohibited'; a minimum speed limit sign that was not included; a rectangular 'Pass either side' sign; and the designs of symbols, like 'telephone' and 'road works ahead'.

Consistency with motorway signs
In 1962, the Anderson Committee published Motorway Signs: Final Report of Advisory Committee for Traffic Signs on Motorways which laid out their designs for motorway signage.

Ultimately, motorway directional and informational signs were included in the 1964 TSRGD. The warning and most regulatory signs proposed in the final Anderson report were not adopted for use, and the designs proposed in the Worboys report were used instead in future motorway projects.

Later revisions
A major review of the direction signing system conducted in the late 1980s found effectively no problems with the Worboys system. This review could only recommend the introduction of white-on-brown tourist signing and a few other minor changes, later known as the Guildford Rules. "Worboys was a world leader in good signing practice".

See also
Transport (typeface) – proposed by the report and still used in Britain for road signs
 Road signs in the United Kingdom

Notes

References

External links
 
  at Wikimedia Commons.
 The Worboys Report at Roads.org.uk
 Traffic signs: report of the committee on traffic signs for all-purpose roads – a copy of the 1963 report, at the Internet Archive
 Motorway Signs: Final Report of Advisory Committee for Traffic Signs on Motorways - a similar 1962 report for motorway signage, some of which was adopted by Traffic Signs report, at the Internet Archive

Street furniture
Traffic signs
Road safety
Signs
Road safety in the United Kingdom